Luisa Carnés (3 January 1905 – 12 March 1964) was a Spanish fiction writer and journalist.

Early life and work 
Carnés was born in Madrid, the daughter of a barber and a seamstress and the oldest of six children. Economic hardship in her family caused her to leave school at age eleven to become a hatmaker's apprentice. An autodidact, she was an avid reader of Cervantes, Dostoevsky, Tolstoy, and Gorky, among others. In 1928 she published her first collection of short stories, Peregrinos de Calvario, and in 1930, her first novel, Natacha. Both were published by the Compañía Iberoamericana de Publicaciones (CIAP), where she worked and where she met her husband, the illustrator Ramón Puyol (1907-1981).

In 1931, after the publisher went out of business, she and Puyol moved from Madrid to Algeciras. In 1932 she returned on her own and began waitressing in a tea room, an experience that inspired what is generally regarded as her best book, Tea Rooms. Mujeres obreras (Tea Rooms. Working-class Women).

She was a member of the Communist Party of Spain (PCE) and an advocate for women's suffrage. An avid defender of the Spanish Republic, after the Spanish Civil War broke out in 1936, she wrote articles and plays in its defense. When the Spanish Republic fell in 1939, she crossed the border to France and from there sailed to Mexico, where, like many Spanish Republicans, she was granted asylum. She remained in Mexico until her death in 1964 in a car accident.

Long forgotten in Spain, since 2002 much of her work has been brought back into print. In 2019 a commemorative plaque was placed on the building where she was born, at Calle Lope de Vega, 31, Madrid. In 2020 her short story "Without a Compass" was published in an English translation by Catherine Nelson in Barricade: A Journal of Antifascism & Translation.

Bibliography 
 Cumpleaños. Los bancos del Prado. Los vendedores de miedo, Publicaciones de la Asociación de Directores de Escena de España, Madrid, 2002.
 El eslabón perdido, Editorial Renacimiento, Sevilla, 2002.
 Tea Rooms. Mujeres obreras, Hoja de Lata, Asturias, 2016
 De Barcelona a la Bretaña francesa, Editorial Renacimiento, 2017
 Trece cuentos (1931-1963), Hoja de Lata, Asturias, 2017.
 De Barcelona a la Bretaña francesa. Memorias, Biblioteca del exilio, Sevilla, 2017.
 Rosalía. Raíz apasionada de Galicia, Hoja de Lata, Asturias, 2018.
 Rojo y gris, Editorial Renacimiento, Sevilla, 2018.
 Donde brotó el laurel, Editorial Renacimiento, Sevilla, 2018.
 Natacha, Editorial Renacimiento, Sevilla, 2019.

References 

Spanish fiction writers
Writers from Madrid
1905 births
1964 deaths
Spanish emigrants to Mexico
Spanish feminists
Las Sinsombrero members